Linus Nässén (born May 10, 1998) is a Swedish professional ice hockey defenceman. He is currently playing with Mikkelin Jukurit of the Finnish Liiga.

Playing career
Nässén made his Swedish Hockey League debut during the 2015–16 SHL season. He appeared in 10 scoreless games with Luleå HF as a 17-year old before he was selected in the third round, 89th overall, in the 2016 NHL Entry Draft by the Florida Panthers.

After continuing in the SHL with Luleå HF for the 2016–17 season, Nässén opted to further his development in North America, selected in the CHL import draft for the second consecutive season and signing with the Medicine Hat Tigers of the Western Hockey League (WHL), on September 21, 2017.

Nässén was productive from the blueline in each of his two seasons with Medicine Hat, however did not receive a contract offer from the Panthers. On April 15, 2019, he agreed to return to his native Sweden, agreeing to a two-year contract with the Växjö Lakers to resume his SHL career.

Career statistics

Regular season and playoffs

International

Awards and honours

References

External links

1998 births
Living people
AIK IF players
Florida Panthers draft picks
Luleå HF players
Medicine Hat Tigers players
Mikkelin Jukurit players
Modo Hockey players
People from Norrtälje
Swedish ice hockey defencemen
Växjö Lakers players
HC Vita Hästen players
Sportspeople from Stockholm County